Bebearia partita, the falcate forester, is a butterfly in the family Nymphalidae. It is found in Cameroon, the Republic of the Congo, the Democratic Republic of the Congo (Mongala, Uele, Ituri, north Kivu, Tshopo, Equateur, Kinshasa, Cataractes, Kwango, Sankuru and Lualaba) and Uganda (Semuliki National Park and Toro). The habitat consists of forests.

The larvae feed on Hypselodelphys species.

Gallery

References

Butterflies described in 1895
partita
Butterflies of Africa